Moulin-Morneault is a settlement in New Brunswick.

History

Notable people

See also
List of communities in New Brunswick

References

Communities in Madawaska County, New Brunswick
Settlements in New Brunswick